Oakland riots may refer to:
 2003 riots following Super Bowl XXXVII in 2003, Oakland, California
 2009 riots connected to the BART Police shooting of Oscar Grant, in Oakland, California
 2009 riots following Super Bowl XLIII, in Oakland (Pittsburgh).
 2011-2012 disturbances related to the Occupy Oakland protests
 2013 unrest following the acquittal of George Zimmerman
 2014 riots following the decision to not charge a police officer in the shooting of Michael Brown.
 2016 riots following the election of Donald Trump as President of the United States.
 2020 protests and riots following the murder of George Floyd in Minnesota